Sri Kesava Bharati was a Hindu member of the Sankarite renunciate order. He bestowed sannyasa on Chaitanya Mahaprabhu when the latter requested it.

In the Sri-Gaura-Ganoddesa-dipika of Kavi Karnapura, Kesava Bharati is listed as the reincarnation of Sandipani Muni.

References

Vedanta
Hindu mystics
Indian Hindu monks
Indian Hindu spiritual teachers